Roxton Independent School District  was a public school district based in Roxton, Texas (USA).

The district had two campuses, namely Roxton High (Grades 7–12) and Roxton Elementary (grades PK–6).

History
In 2009, the school district was rated "academically acceptable" by the Texas Education Agency.

During the 2012–2013 school year, the Roxton Lions won the state championship in boys basketball, beating the Douglass Indians from Douglass, Texas.

In 2018 the district leadership stated that it wished to consolidate due to financial problems and that it was holding discussions with two potential suitor school districts. There was also consideration of the district becoming elementary only. Roxton ISD and Chisum ISD formed a consolidation agreement, signed by the board of Chisum ISD, and the measure was to be put to the voters.

Roxton ISD closed after the 2018–2019 school year and consolidated with the Chisum Independent School District.

Notable alumni
Tia Ballard, voice actress for Funimation Entertainment, is a 2004 graduate.

References

External links

 Posted information about the consolidation of Chisum ISD and Roxton ISD - Chisum Independent School District

Former school districts in Texas
School districts in Lamar County, Texas
2019 disestablishments in Texas
Educational institutions disestablished in 2019